The Los Angeles Handicap is an American Thoroughbred horse race run annually at Santa Anita Park in Arcadia, California during the spring racing season. It was previously run at Hollywood Park Racetrack in Inglewood, California), which closed in 2013. A Grade III sprint race run on dirt over a distance of six furlongs, it is open to horses aged three and older. 

The race was not run in 2018. From 2007 to 2013, it was run on (Cushion Track synthetic dirt. For 2015 only, the race was run at Los Alamitos Racetrack and shortened to  furlongs due to the track dimensions. Prior to 1979, the race was run at a distance of seven furlongs.

The 1968 race was run in two divisions.

Records
Speed record:
 1:07.55 - Street Boss (2008) (at current distance of 6 furlongs)
 1:19.80 - Triple Bend (1972) (stakes, track, and world record (at previous distance of 7 furlongs)

Most wins:
 2 - Native Diver (1965, 1967)

Most wins by a jockey:
 6 - Laffit Pincay, Jr. (1968, 1974, 1975, 1980, 1989, 1997)
 5 - Donald Pierce (1969, 1970, 1971, 1972, 1973)

Most wins by a trainer:
 5 - John W. Sadler (1986, 1988, 2003, 2009, 2010)
 4 - Buster Millerick (1965, 1967, 1968, 1983)
 4 - Bruce Headley (1999, 2002, 2008, 2014)

Most wins by an owner:
 2 - Austin C. Taylor (1938, 1956)
 2 - Fred W. Hooper (1962, 1977)
 2 - M/M Louis K. Shapiro (1965, 1967)
 2 - Gary & Cecil Barber (2009, 2010)

Winners

 † In 1996 there was a dead heat for first.

References

 June 26, 1938 Los Angeles Times report on the Los Angeles Handicap
 Thoroughbred Times - May 16, 2009  report on the 2009 Los Angeles Handicap

Graded stakes races in the United States
Horse races in California
Open sprint category horse races
Recurring sporting events established in 1938
Santa Anita Park
1938 establishments in California